Wādī Nakhlah is a wadi and is located at 14.00185 ° N 44.0001°E in Al Ḩudaydah, Yemen.

It flows from  the Mountains of the Yemen Highlands, at 395 meters height, past  Al Jarrahi, Yemen, Zabid, At Tuhayta across the Tihamah Coastal plain and into the Red Sea at Al Fazah, near resort town of Khawkhah.

References

Taiz Governorate